There are many bridges in the city of Paris, principally over the River Seine, but also over the Canal de l'Ourcq.

Statistics 
In 2006, Paris had:
 148 bridges over the Boulevard Périphérique
 58 bridges used to carry Parisian streets over each other
 49 passerelles piétonnières (pedestrian bridges)
 37 bridges over the Seine
 33 bridges used by the SNCF
 10 bridges used by the Régie Autonome des Transports Parisiens (RATP)

Seine 

Paris has 37 bridges across the Seine, of which 5 are pedestrian only and 2 are rail bridges.  Three link Île Saint-Louis to the rest of Paris, 8 do the same for Île de la Cité and one links the 2 islands to each other. A list follows, from upstream to downstream :

 Pont amont (carrying the Boulevard Périphérique, situated at the river's entry to the city)
 Pont National
 Pont de Tolbiac
 Passerelle Simone-de-Beauvoir (pedestrian), inaugurated 13 July 2006
 Pont de Bercy (made up of a railway bridge carrying the Line 6 of the Paris Métro and another stage for road traffic) ;
 Pont Charles-de-Gaulle (1996)
 Pont d'Austerlitz
 Pont de Sully (crosses the eastern corner of Île Saint-Louis)
 Pont de la Tournelle (between the Rive Gauche and the Île Saint-Louis)
 Pont Marie (between Île Saint-Louis  and the rive droite)
 Pont Louis-Philippe (between Île Saint-Louis  and the rive droite)
 Pont Saint-Louis (pedestrian zone, between Île de la Cité and the Île Saint-Louis)
 Pont de l'Archevêché (between the rive gauche and Île de la Cité)
 Pont au Double (between the rive gauche and Île de la Cité)
 Pont d'Arcole (between Île de la Cité  and the rive droite)
 Petit Pont (between the rive gauche and Île de la Cité)
 Pont Notre-Dame (between the Île de la Cité  and the rive droite)
 Pont Saint-Michel (between the Rive Gauche and the Île de la Cité)
 Pont au Change (between the Île de la Cité and the Rive Droite)
 Pont Neuf (crossing the west corner of the Île de la Cité, Paris's oldest bridge, built between 1578 and 1607)
 Passerelle des Arts (pedestrian)
 Pont du Carrousel
 Pont Royal
 Passerelle Léopold-Sédar-Senghor (1999) (pedestrian, formerly the Passerelle de Solférino, renamed in 2006)
 Pont de la Concorde
 Pont Alexandre III
 Pont des Invalides
 Pont de l'Alma
 Passerelle Debilly (pedestrian)
 Pont d'Iéna
 Pont de Bir-Hakeim (crossing the Île aux Cygnes, comprising one stage with a railway bridge carrying Line 6 of the Paris Métro and another for road traffic)
 Pont Rouelle (rail viaduct for line C of the RER crossing the Île aux Cygnes)
 Pont de Grenelle (crossing the Île aux Cygnes)
 Pont Mirabeau
 Pont du Garigliano
 Pont aval (used by the boulevard périphérique, at the river's exit from the city)

Parisian canals 
The  are crossed by a number of bridges – the majority of which are passerelles piétonnes (footbridges) – and many of the road bridges can be raised or turned (temporarily interrupting road traffic) to allow canal traffic through.

 On the canal de l'Ourcq :
 Pont de la rue de l'Ourcq
 Passerelle de la rue de Crimée
 Pont levant de la rue de Crimée
 On the canal Saint-Denis :
 Boulevard Périphérique
 Boulevard Macdonald
 Avenue Corentin-Cariou
 On the canal Saint-Martin :
 Pont de la rue Louis Blanc
 Passerelle Bichat
 Pont tournant de la Grange aux Belles
 Passerelle Richerand
 Passerelle Alibert
 Pont tournant de la rue Dieu
 Passerelle des Douanes
 At the level of the bassin de l'Arsenal :
 Passerelle de Mornay
 Pont Morland
 Pont-métro Morland

Passerelles piétonnières 
Paris has 49 passerelles piétonnières (footbridges), listed by arrondissement:

 1st arrondissement of Paris :
 Passerelle Baillet
 Passerelle des Tuileries
 4th arrondissement of Paris :
 Passerelle de l'Hôtel-de-Ville
 6th arrondissement of Paris :
 Pont des Arts
 7th arrondissement of Paris :
 Passerelle du Bac
 Passerelle Debilly
 Passerelle Léopold-Sédar-Senghor
 9th arrondissement of Paris :
 Pont de Cristal
 Passerelle de Crimée
 Passerelle Le Peletier
 Passerelle de Mogador
 Passerelle de la rue de Provence
 Passerelle Sainte-Cécile
 10th arrondissement of Paris :
 Passerelle des Douanes
 Passerelle Alibert
 Passerelle Richerand
 Passerelle de la Grange-aux-Belles
 Passerelle Bichat
 Passerelle de la rue de Maubeuge
 12th arrondissement of Paris :
 Passerelle de l'Arsenal
 Passerelle des Meuniers
 Passerelle Reuilly
 Passerelle de Picpus
 13th arrondissement of Paris :
 Passerelle du Quai de la Gare
 Passerelle Corvisart
 Passerelle Alésia
 Passerelle Commandant René Mouchotte
 Passerelle Gergovie
 Passerelle Vercingétorix
 Passerelle Alain
 Passerelle Jean Zay
 Passerelle des Arts et Métiers
 Passerelle du Cambodge
 15th arrondissement of Paris :
 Passerelle Bargues
 Passerelle du Capitaine Ménard
 Passerelle Ernest Renan
 Passerelle rue de l'Ingénieur Robert Keller
 Passerelle Leblanc
 Passerelle Procession
 Passerelle Tuileries
 Passerelle des Quatre frères Peignot
 16th arrondissement of Paris :
 Passerelle l'Alboni
 Passerelle de l'Avre
 Passerelle Géo André
 Passerelle Suzanne Lenglen
 17th arrondissement of Paris :
 Passerelle de la rue Juliette Lamber
 18th arrondissement of Paris :
 Passerelle de la rue Belhomme
 19th arrondissement of Paris :
 Passerelle des Ardennes
 Passerelle de Crimée
 Passerelle d'Hautpoul
 Passerelle de la Moselle
 Passerelle du Rond Point
 20th arrondissement of Paris :
 Passerelle de la Mare
 Passerelle Lambeau
 Reshma Timsina Bridge

Miscellaneous
There are several other bridges in Paris which do not cross a body of water. In the 10th arrondissement, Rue La Fayette and Rue de l'Aqueduc pass over the train lines of gare de l'Est.  On the boundary between the 5th and 13th arrondissements, boulevard de Port-Royal spans Rue Broca and Rue Pascal.  In the 18th arrondissement, rue Caulaincourt is carried over the Montmartre Cemetery by a bridge.  In the 20th arrondissement,  rue Charles-Renouvier spans rue des Pyrénées. In the 8th arrondissement, rue du Rocher crosses rue de Madrid.

Also, 2 and 6 of the Paris metro include several aerial viaducts in their above-ground zones, whilst RER C also has a viaduct along the length of quai André-Citroën.

Footbridges may also be found in the Parc des Buttes Chaumont and parc de Reuilly. Among others, the promenade plantée uses the old viaduc Daumesnil.  In bois de Vincennes, the islands of Bercy and of Reuilly are linked to each other, and the east of the latter to the rest of the park.

The line for the chemin de fer de Petite Ceinture also includes several bridges and viaducts, as well as footbridges across it such as that carrying rue de la Mare in the 20th arrondissement.

See also
List of crossings of the River Seine

References

External links
  The city's official site.
  City article on canals
  Detailed and documented list of Paris' bridges.
  Historical photos from the present-day and the 1900s.
  Lists of Paris' works of art, including bridges.
  

 
Tourist attractions in Paris
Paris
 
Bridges
Paris